The men's triathlon was an artistic gymnastics event held as part of the Gymnastics at the 1904 Summer Olympics programme. It was the only time the event was held at the Olympics. The competition was held on Friday, July 1, 1904, and on Saturday, July 2, 1904. One hundred and nineteen gymnasts from three nations competed.

The three apparatus used were the horizontal bar, the parallel bars, and the horse (itself actually split further between the "long horse" or vault and the "side horse" or pommel horse). Each gymnast performed two compulsory routines and one optional routine on each apparatus, with the compulsory routines split between the two versions of the horse and the optional horse routine being on the side horse. The maximum score in each routine was 5, for a total maximum of 45.

Scores from this event, as well as the athletics triathlon event, were used to determine final scoring in the gymnastic all-around event.

Results

References

Sources
 

Triathlon